Eliezer Toledano (born 12 October 1973) is an Israeli Aluf (major general) who served as the commander of the Paratroopers Brigade, Military Secretary to the Prime Minister, and the commander of the Gaza Division. He serves as the commander of the Southern Command.

Military career
In 1990, Toledano became an infantry officer after completing officer candidate school, and was drafted into the Israeli Defense Forces (IDF) in 1991. He served as 890 "Efe" (Echis) Paratroop Battalion Executive Officer during Operation Defensive Shield, led 101st "Peten" (Elapidae) paratroop battalion in counter-terror operations during the Second Intifada. Later on he commanded Maglan Unit in the 2006 Lebanon War. Afterwards he served as the Executive Officer of the Judea and Samaria Division and as the commander of a Reserve Paratroopers Brigade. During Operation Protective Edge, under his command, the 35th Paratroopers Brigade was assigned to operate in Khan Yunis. It had located and destroyed four of Hamas' terror tunnels and killed 141 terrorists. Afterwards he was appointed as the Military Secretary to the Prime Minister. 

In October, 2018, he was named commander of the IDF's Gaza Division, and filled this role until August, 2020. During his cadence he led the Gaza Division through the 2018–2019 Gaza border protests and various military operations and clashes versus the terror organizations Hamas and the Islamic Jihad Movement in Palestine. The most prominent of those are Operation Black Belt, Gaza–Israel clashes (May 2019), and the Gaza–Israel clashes (November 2018).

In March 2021 he was appointed to be the commander of the Southern Command, and led the operation Guardian of the Walls right after his appointment.

References

1973 births
Israeli generals
Living people
Israeli military personnel
People from Kiryat Motzkin